Streptomyces xanthochromogenes is a bacterium species from the genus of Streptomyces which has been isolated from soil in Japan. Streptomyces xanthochromogenes produces xanthicin.

See also 
 List of Streptomyces species

References

Further reading

External links
Type strain of Streptomyces xanthochromogenes at BacDive -  the Bacterial Diversity Metadatabase

xanthochromogenes
Bacteria described in 1956